Teruaki (written: 光昭, 久晃, 照明 or 輝昭) is a masculine Japanese given name. Notable people with the name include:

, Japanese footballer
, Japanese footballer
, Japanese activist
, Japanese actor and voice actor
, Japanese classical composer
Teruaki Yamagishi (born 1934), Japanese businessman
, Japanese baseball player

Japanese masculine given names